The 1977 Major League Baseball postseason was the playoff tournament of Major League Baseball for the 1977 season. The winners of each division advance to the postseason and face each other in a League Championship Series to determine the pennant winners that face each other in the World Series. 

In the American League, both the New York Yankees and the Kansas City Royals returned for the second year in a row. In the National League, the Philadelphia Phillies made their second consecutive appearance, and the Los Angeles Dodgers returned for the second time in four years. This was the first of two consecutive postseasons to feature the Yankees, Royals, Phillies, and Dodgers. The former three teams would again appear in the postseason in 1980, and all four would appear again in the expanded 1981 postseason.

The playoffs began on October 4, 1977, and concluded on October 18, 1977, with the New York Yankees defeating the Los Angeles Dodgers in the 1977 World Series. It was the Yankees' first championship since 1962.

Playoff seeds
The following teams qualified for the postseason:

American League
 New York Yankees - 100–62, Clinched AL East
 Kansas City Royals - 102–60, Clinched AL West

National League
 Philadelphia Phillies - 101–61, Clinched NL East
 Los Angeles Dodgers - 98–64, Clinched NL West

Playoff bracket

American League Championship Series

Kansas City Royals vs. New York Yankees

This was the second straight ALCS to feature the Yankees and Royals. The Yankees took the previous series in five games on a Chris Chambliss home run in the ninth inning of Game 5. The Yankees again defeated the Royals in 5 games to advance to the World Series for the second year in a row.

Both teams split the first two games at Yankee Stadium - the Royals blew out the Yankees in Game 1 thanks to stellar pitching from starting pitcher Paul Splittorff and closer Doug Bird. In Game 2, the Yankees evened the series with a 6-2 victory as starting pitcher Ron Guidry pitched a complete game. When the series moved to Kansas City, Royals' starter Dennis Leonard pitched a four-hit complete game as the Royals won 6-2, and were now one win away from clinching their first World Series berth in front of their home fans. However, the Yankees narrowly took Game 4 as they held off a late rally by the Royals. In Game 5, the Royals held a 3-2 lead going into the ninth, but the Yankees yet again defeated the Royals in their last at bat, scoring three unanswered runs to take the lead for good and secure the pennant.

Both teams would meet again in the ALCS the next year, which the Yankees also won. It would be in 1980 that the Royals would finally break through against the Yankees.

National League Championship Series

Philadelphia Phillies vs. Los Angeles Dodgers

This was the first postseason meeting between the Dodgers and Phillies. The Dodgers defeated the Phillies in 4 games to advance to the World Series for the second time in four years. 

Game 1 was a slugfest with the Phillies narrowly won in the top of the ninth off RBI singles from Mike Schmidt and Larry Bowa. The Dodgers blew out the Phillies in Game 2 off a complete game performance from Don Sutton, evening the series headed to Philadelphia. Game 3 went down in Phillies' baseball lore as "Black Friday." The Phillies held a 5-3 lead going into the top of the ninth, but the Dodgers scored three unanswered runs to prevail and take a 2-1 series lead. It was the first time since Game 4 of the 1947 World Series that the Dodgers won a postseason game when trailing going into the ninth. Tommy John pitched a complete game for the Dodgers in Game 4 as they secured the pennant. 

Both teams would meet each other again in the NLCS again in 1978, 1983, 2008, and 2009, with the Dodgers winning in the former series, and the Phillies taking the latter three series.

1977 World Series

New York Yankees (AL) vs. Los Angeles Dodgers (NL)

This was the ninth World Series meeting in the history of the Dodgers-Yankees rivalry. In this World Series between the two historic rivals, the Yankees defeated the Dodgers in six games to capture their first championship since 1962. 

The first two games were split between both teams - the Yankees prevailed in a 12-inning battle in Game 1, while the Dodgers convincingly took Game 2 off a five-hit complete game performance from starter Burt Hooton to even the series. When the series moved to Los Angeles, the Yankees took Game 3 off a complete game performance from Mike Torrez, and ace Ron Guidry pitched yet another complete game for the Yankees in Game 4 as they went up 3-1 in the series. In Game 5, the Dodgers, thanks to a complete game performance from Don Sutton, blew out the Yankees, 10-6, to send the series back to the Bronx. In Game 6, the Yankees prevailed by four runs, capped off by a solo home run from Reggie Jackson in the bottom of the eighth which sealed the title for New York. 

The Dodgers and Yankees would meet each other again the next year, and in 1981, with the Yankees winning the former and the Dodgers winning the latter.

References

External links
 League Baseball Standings & Expanded Standings - 1977

 
Major League Baseball postseason